Kim Kluijskens (born 9 June 1984, in IJmuiden) is a Dutch softball player, who represents the Dutch national team in international competitions.

Kluijskens played for De Pino's, Kinheim and since 2001 for Sparks Haarlem. She is a first baseman who bats and throws left-handed. She competes for the Dutch national team since 2001. She is part of the Dutch team for the 2008 Summer Olympics in Beijing.

External links
 Kluijskens at dutchsoftballteam.com

References

1984 births
Living people
Dutch softball players
Olympic softball players of the Netherlands
Softball players at the 2008 Summer Olympics
People from Velsen
Sportspeople from North Holland